Criminal justice is the delivery of justice to those who have committed crimes.

Criminal justice may also refer to:

 Criminal Justice (film), a 1990 American drama film
 Criminal Justice (British TV series), a 2008 British television drama series
 Criminal Justice (Indian TV series), an Indian Hindi-language crime thriller legal drama web series